Olimpia Reservas is a Honduran football club, based in Talanga, Honduras and they play in the municipal stadium.

They are the reserve team of Olimpia and have spent several seasons in the Honduran second division.

Football clubs in Honduras
C.D. Olimpia